Maria Franca Fissolo (born 21 January 1939) is a Monaco-based Italian billionaire, the widow of Michele Ferrero, and the owner of Ferrero SpA, Europe's second-largest confectionery company.

Net worth
As of March 2018, Forbes estimated her net worth at $2.2 billion.

Personal life
She married Michele Ferrero in 1962, and they had two sons together, Giovanni Ferrero and Pietro Ferrero Jr. She lives in Monaco.

References

1941 births
Living people
Female billionaires
Ferrero family
Italian billionaires
Italian businesspeople
Italian expatriates in Monaco
People from Monte Carlo